Amata caerulescens is a moth of the subfamily Arctiinae. It was described by Herbert Druce in 1898. It is found in Mozambique.

References

 

Endemic fauna of Mozambique
caerulescens
Moths described in 1898
Moths of Sub-Saharan Africa
Lepidoptera of Mozambique